Alfred Delavan Thomas (August 11, 1837 – August 8, 1896) was a United States district judge of the United States District Court for the District of North Dakota.

Education and career

Born in Delavan, Walworth County, Wisconsin Territory (now Wisconsin), Thomas read law and graduated from Brown University in 1861. He was district attorney of Walworth County from about 1861 to 1867, and had a private practice in Delavan from 1864 to 1877, and in Fargo, Dakota Territory beginning in 1878. He was attorney for the Homestake Mining Company of Deadwood, Dakota Territory (now South Dakota) until 1882, returning to private practice in Fargo, Dakota Territory (State of North Dakota from November 2, 1889) from 1882 to 1890.

Federal judicial service

On February 19, 1890, Thomas was nominated by President Benjamin Harrison to a new seat on the United States District Court for the District of North Dakota created by 25 Stat. 676. He was confirmed by the United States Senate on February 25, 1890, and received his commission the same day. He served in that capacity until his death on August 8, 1896, in Fargo.

References

Sources
 

1837 births
1896 deaths
People from Delavan, Wisconsin
Lawyers from Fargo, North Dakota
Judges of the United States District Court for the District of North Dakota
United States federal judges appointed by Benjamin Harrison
19th-century American judges
19th-century American politicians
Wisconsin lawyers
United States federal judges admitted to the practice of law by reading law